Ethical naturalism (also called moral naturalism or naturalistic cognitivistic definism) is the meta-ethical view which claims that:

 Ethical sentences express propositions.
 Some such propositions are true.
 Those propositions are made true by objective features of the world.
 These moral features of the world are reducible to some set of non-moral features.

Overview
The versions of ethical naturalism which have received the most sustained philosophical interest, for example, Cornell realism, differ from the position that "the way things are is always the way they ought to be", which few ethical naturalists hold. Ethical naturalism does, however, reject the fact-value distinction: it suggests that inquiry into the natural world can increase our moral knowledge in just the same way it increases our scientific knowledge. Indeed, proponents of ethical naturalism have argued that humanity needs to invest in the science of morality, a broad and loosely defined field that uses evidence from biology, primatology, anthropology, psychology, neuroscience, and other areas to classify and describe moral behavior.

Ethical naturalism encompasses any reduction of ethical properties, such as 'goodness', to non-ethical properties; there are many different examples of such reductions, and thus many different varieties of ethical naturalism. Hedonism, for example, is the view that goodness is ultimately just pleasure.

Ethical theories that can be naturalistic
Altruism
Consequentialism
Consequentialist libertarianism
Cornell realism
Ethical egoism/ Objectivism
Evolutionary ethics
Hedonism
Humanistic ethics
Natural-rights libertarianism
Utilitarianism
Virtue ethics

Criticisms
Ethical naturalism has been criticized most prominently by ethical non-naturalist G. E. Moore, who formulated the open-question argument. Garner and Rosen say that a common definition of "natural property" is one "which can be discovered by sense observation or experience, experiment, or through any of the available means of science." They also say that a good definition of "natural property" is problematic but that "it is only in criticism of naturalism, or in an attempt to distinguish between naturalistic and nonnaturalistic definist theories, that such a concept is needed." R. M. Hare also criticised ethical naturalism because of what he considered its fallacious definition of the terms 'good' or 'right', saying that value-terms being part of our prescriptive moral language are not reducible to descriptive terms: "Value-terms have a special function in language, that of commending; and so they plainly cannot be defined in terms of other words which themselves do not perform this function".

Moral nihilism
Moral nihilists maintain that there are no such entities as objective values or objective moral facts. Proponents of moral science like Ronald A. Lindsay have counter-argued that their way of understanding "morality" as a practical enterprise is the way we ought to have understood it in the first place. He holds the position that the alternative seems to be the elaborate philosophical reduction of the word "moral" into a vacuous, useless term. Lindsay adds that it is important to reclaim the specific word "morality" because of the connotations it holds with many individuals.

Morality as a science

Author Sam Harris has argued that we overestimate the relevance of many arguments against the science of morality, arguments he believes scientists happily and rightly disregard in other domains of science like physics. For example, scientists may find themselves attempting to argue against philosophical skeptics, when Harris says they should be practically asking – as they would in any other domain – "why would we listen to a solipsist in the first place?" This, Harris contends, is part of what it means to practice a science of morality.

In modern times, many thinkers discussing the fact–value distinction and the is–ought problem have settled on the idea that one cannot derive ought from is. Conversely, Harris maintains that the fact-value distinction is a confusion, proposing that values are really a certain kind of fact. Specifically, Harris suggests that values amount to empirical statements about "the flourishing of conscious creatures in a society". He argues that there are objective answers to moral questions, even if some are difficult or impossible to possess in practice. In this way, he says, science can tell us what to value. Harris adds that we do not demand absolute certainty from predictions in physics, so we should not demand that of a science studying morality (see The Moral Landscape).

Physicist Sean Carroll believes that conceiving of morality as a science could be a case of scientific imperialism and insists that what is "good for conscious creatures" is not an adequate working definition of "moral". In opposition, Vice President at the Center for Inquiry, John Shook, claims that this working definition is more than adequate for science at present, and that disagreement should not immobilize the scientific study of ethics.

References

Other sources

External links

Philosophy 302: Naturalistic Ethics

Meta-ethics
Naturalism (philosophy)